Francisco de Mora (c.1553–1610) was a Spanish Renaissance architect.

Mora was born in Cuenca, and was an uncle of both the architect Juan Gómez de Mora and the humanist Baltasar Porreño. He is considered one of the best representatives of Herrerian architecture, a style that developed in the last third of the 16th century, although his best work also anticipates the Baroque currents that would dominate 17th-century architecture. He was the designer of the Convento de San José (Ávila) and of the Palacio ducal de Lerma (Lerma, Burgos), which had a major influence on later religious and secular architecture.  He died in Madrid.

1553 births
1610 deaths
People from Cuenca, Spain
Spanish architects
Renaissance architects
16th-century Spanish architects